Llano de Catival o Mariato  is a corregimiento in Mariato District, Veraguas Province, Panama with a population of 2,376 as of 2010. It is the seat of Mariato District. Its population as of 1990 was 2,052; its population as of 2000 was 2,269.

References

Corregimientos of Veraguas Province